McLeod Hill is a tuya, located  north of Clearwater in the Wells Gray-Clearwater volcanic field in Wells Gray Provincial Park, east-central British Columbia, Canada.

McLeod Hill last erupted about 12,000 years ago when the Murtle Plateau was still covered by ice. However, it may also be the oldest volcano in the Clearwater Valley, dating to about 200,000 years ago when it was the source of the vast quantity of lava that comprises the Murtle Plateau. Viewed from Green Mountain, it looks like a low rounded dome, quite different from nearby Pyramid Mountain.

The Wells Gray Loppet Trail, a popular cross-country ski route, goes over McLeod Hill. The ski trail is tracked by B.C. Parks volunteers during most winters. Beyond the King Hut rest stop, the trail climbs steeply onto McLeod Hill, then there is a long descent into Hemp Creek Valley. In summer, the trail is one of Wells Gray Park's few mountain biking routes.

See also
 List of volcanoes in Canada
 Volcanism of Canada
 Volcanism of Western Canada

Footnotes

Volcanoes of British Columbia
One-thousanders of British Columbia
Tuyas of Canada
Wells Gray-Clearwater
Pleistocene volcanoes
Monogenetic volcanoes
Kamloops Division Yale Land District